Thai Mueang is a district (amphoe) in Phang Nga province in the south of Thailand.

Geography
Neighboring districts are (from the north clockwise): Takua Pa, Kapong, Mueang Phang Nga, and Takua Thung. To the west is the Andaman Sea.

Khao Lampi–Hat Thai Mueang National Park was established in 1986 and covers 72 km2. The park consists of two parts: the beach of Thai Mueang as well as natural rain forest on Lampi mountain.

Administration 
The district is divided into six sub-districts (tambons), which are further subdivided into 40 villages (mubans). Thai Mueang itself has township (thesaban tambon) status. There are six tambon administrative organizations (TAO).

See also
Khao Lampi-Hat Thai Mueang National Park

Thai Mueang